The Spring Hill College Quadrangle is a grouping of historic structures on the campus of Spring Hill College in Mobile, Alabama, United States.  The original main building was constructed in 1831 in the Greek Revival style, but burned in 1869.  It was replaced within the year by a new main building on the same site in a Neo-Renaissance style.  St. Joseph's Chapel was built c.1910 in the Gothic Revival style on the northern side of the quadrangle, with the main building on the southern side.  The perimeter of the quadrangle is enclosed by an open arched arcade, topped by crenellation.  The grouping was placed on the National Register of Historic Places on August 17, 1973.

See also
Spring Hill College

References

National Register of Historic Places in Mobile, Alabama
Spring Hill College
Renaissance Revival architecture in Alabama
Gothic Revival architecture in Alabama
University and college buildings on the National Register of Historic Places in Alabama